Valletta United Water Polo Club is a Water Polo club from Valletta, Malta, and was founded in 1903. The club competes in the Maltese Waterpolo Premier League.

For sponsorship reasons, the club was known as Valletta Videoslots between 2018 and 2020.

The club is currently known as Valletta IZIBET, for sponsorship reasons.

The Club has won 11 Water Polo Premier Divisions (1926, 1950, 1951, 1955, 1956, 1970, 1971, 1973, 1980, 1985, 1990) and 7 Premier KOs, in addition to 2 First Division (2013, 2020) and 2 First Division KOs (2013, 2020).

Premises
The club's premises, on Valletta's Marsamxett side, were left in ruins for a long period of time, with letters appearing in newspapers from 2010. Things seemed to have remained the same till 8 years later, when Nationalist Party Member of Parliament Claudio Grech created awareness about the state of the club's premises. Around a month later, the club was given title of the land from the Government of Malta and announced a €2.5 million investment to revamp the club's premises and facilities.

Current squad
As at August, 2021:
 Benjamin Busuttil 
 Andrew Bugeja 
 Andrea Agius
 Nicholas Farrugia
 Sebastian Busuttil
 Daniel Paolella
 Michele Mifsud
 Miguel Zammit
 Kyle Cremona
 Peter Borg
 Matthew Pace
 Keith Galea

Head coach: Joseph Cremona

References

External links
Waterpolo: Valletta United Water Polo Club prepare for upcoming Winter League

Water polo clubs in Malta
Sports clubs established in 1903
1903 establishments in Malta
Sport in Valletta